Polyana is a rural locality (a settlement) in Ufa, Bashkortostan, Russia. The population was 54 as of 2010. There is 1 street.

Geography 
Polyana is located 27 km south of Ufa. Iskinois the nearest rural locality.

References 

Rural localities in Ufa urban okrug